HNoMS Thor Heyerdahl is a Fridtjof Nansen-class frigate of the Royal Norwegian Navy.

Construction and commissioning
Built by the Spanish shipbuilders Navantia, in Ferrol, Thor Heyerdahl was the fifth and last of the Fridtjof Nansen class to be launched and then commissioned into the Royal Norwegian Navy. Unlike the other members of her class, she was built with two 8-cell VLS modules instead of one.

References

External links
 - Royal Norwegian Navy's page on the Fridtjof Nansen class

Frigates of Norway
Fridtjof Nansen-class frigates
2009 ships
Ships built in Spain